Pierre Toussaint Marcel de Serres de Mesplès (3 November 1780  – 22 July 1862 in  Montpellier), also known as Marcel de Serres, was a French caver, geologist and naturalist.

Biography
Professor of mineralogy and geology in the faculty of science  at Montpellier University from 1809. He occupied this university chair for 53 years. His professional interests included the human and animal fossils of the caves of the south of France. At his end, he contributed to the French state a large number of fossils of the region Languedoc.

He was contemporary with Cuvier (either Frédéric or Georges ).

References

External links
(University of Michigan)  sound recording (2006)  Miami Beach, FL : Sony BMG Music A punto de estallar − 1843 
Géognosie des terrains tertiaires: ou, Tableau des principaux animaux invertébrés des terrains marins tertiaires, du midi de la France [Knowledge from the earth in the tertiary environment or, Tableau of the principle invertebrate animals of the marine landscape of the middle of France]. – 276 pages Chez Pomathio-Durville, 1829 
 

1780 births
1862 deaths
French cavers
French geologists
French naturalists
Sportspeople from Montpellier